Roseanna Cunningham (born 27 July 1951) is a retired Scottish National Party (SNP) politician who served as Cabinet Secretary for Environment, Climate Change and Land Reform from 2016 to 2021. She was previously Cabinet Secretary for Fair Work, Skills and Training from 2014 until 2016.

She served as the Member of the Scottish Parliament (MSP) for Perth from 1999 to 2011, and then for Perthshire South and Kinross-shire from 2011 to 2021. She was formerly Member of Parliament (MP) for Perth and Kinross from 1995 to 1997 then for Perth 1997 to 2001.

Early life, education and legal practice
Cunningham was born on 27 July 1951 in Glasgow to Catherine and Hugh Cunningham, and spent her early years living in East Lothian and Edinburgh. In 1960, she emigrated with her family to Perth in Australia, and completed her schooling at John Curtin High School in Fremantle. As a teenager, she became interested in politics, and in 1969 joined the SNP as an overseas member. In 1975 Cunningham graduated from the University of Western Australia with a BA Hons in politics. She returned to Scotland in 1976.

She worked as a research assistant at SNP headquarters from 1977 to 1979, and was a member of the left-wing 79 Group inside the SNP during the early 1980s, but avoided expulsion as she was not a member of its steering committee (future SNP leader Alex Salmond by contrast who served on the 79 Group committee was expelled, while Margo MacDonald resigned from the party in protest before she could be expelled).

Cunningham returned to university in 1980, graduating from the University of Edinburgh in 1982 with a Bachelor of Laws degree, followed in 1983 by a Diploma in Legal Practice from the University of Aberdeen. She worked as a solicitor for Dumbarton District Council and Glasgow District Council. After a brief period in private practice, she was admitted to the Faculty of Advocates in 1990.

Political career
In the 1992 general election Cunningham stood in the Perth and Kinross constituency, losing by around 2,000 votes.

In 1995, she gained the seat in the Perth and Kinross by-election succeeding the recently deceased Conservative MP, Sir Nicholas Fairbairn. She had initially been left off the SNP's candidate shortlist over her brief relationship in the 1970s with Donald Bain, then husband of SNP MP Margaret Ewing, on the grounds that the issue could prove an embarrassment to the party. Cunningham said the affair had begun after the couple had separated. She was put back in contention following an intervention by the then party leader Alex Salmond, and after Ewing made clear she had no objection to Cunningham's candidature. In the 1997 election, she stood for the Perth constituency and was elected.

In 1999 she became the MSP for Perth. In 2000, she was elected the SNP Senior Vice-Convener (depute leader). Also in that year, she helped establish the Scottish Left Review publication. She stood down as an MP in 2001, to concentrate on the Scottish Parliament.

John Swinney announced his resignation as leader of the SNP on 22 June 2004, and on the same day, Cunningham announced that she would be a candidate in the subsequent election for the party leadership. In the early stages of the campaign, she appeared to be the clear front-runner, but former leader Alex Salmond entered the race just before nominations closed and Cunningham finished a distant second.

In December 2006, she led an unsuccessful attempt to prevent same-sex couples from gaining the right to adopt children, despite having previously been named ScotsGay Parliamentarian of the Year in 1998.  When legislation to introduce same-sex marriage in Scotland was passed by the Scottish Parliament in February 2014, she voted against the bill.

In the first reshuffle of the SNP Government in February 2009, Cunningham was appointed as Minister for the Environment. In December 2010, she also took on portfolio responsibility for climate change, becoming Minister for the Environment and Climate Change. After the 2011 election, which saw an SNP landslide, she was appointed Minister for Community Safety and Legal Affairs with special responsibility for tackling sectarianism.

In Nicola Sturgeon's first reshuffle in November 2014, she was promoted to Cabinet as Cabinet Secretary for Fair Work, Skills and Training.

She announced on 21 August 2020 that she would step down as an MSP in the 2021 Scottish election.

References

External links
Official website
 
SNP website
 

|-

|-

|-

|-

|-

1951 births
Living people
Female members of the Parliament of the United Kingdom for Scottish constituencies
Members of the Faculty of Advocates
Members of the Parliament of the United Kingdom for Scottish constituencies
Members of the Scottish Parliament 1999–2003
Members of the Scottish Parliament 2003–2007
Members of the Scottish Parliament 2007–2011
Members of the Scottish Parliament 2011–2016
Members of the Scottish Cabinet
Politicians from Glasgow
Politics of Perth and Kinross
Scottish emigrants to Australia
Scottish National Party MPs
Scottish National Party MSPs
Scottish republicans
Scottish solicitors
UK MPs 1992–1997
UK MPs 1997–2001
Alumni of the University of Edinburgh
People associated with Perth and Kinross
Members of the Scottish Parliament 2016–2021
People educated at John Curtin College of the Arts
University of Western Australia alumni
Scottish women lawyers
Women members of the Scottish Government
20th-century Scottish women politicians
Scottish lawyers